Jarryd Coetsee (born August 5, 1982) is a South African writer and filmmaker. His short film, The Suit won numerous international awards.

Early life and education
Coetsee was born in Pretoria where he attended Pretoria Boys High School. He studied English literature and film-making in South Africa and the UK. His family are the custodians of Coetsenburg, one of the oldest wine estates in South Africa, established in 1682.

Career
His short film, The Suit, won numerous international awards including the Best Short Film Award at the 11th SAFTAs and has been shown in 83 cities and towns in over 20 countries. The film features performances by Tony Award-winner John Kani and Atandwa Kani. Three of the film festivals for which it was selected are Oscar qualifiers (Urbanworld Film Festival, Pan African Film Festival and BronzeLens Film Festival). Coetsee was the only filmmaker from Africa selected by the Académie des Arts et Techniques du Cinéma for its prestigious Les Nuits en Or 2017 (Golden Nights 2017) which saw him participate in film-related programmes in France, Italy and Greece, and receiving an award from UNESCO at its headquarters, the World Heritage Centre, in Paris for The Suit which was selected as one of the thirty top short films from around the world.

Filmography

References

1982 births
Living people
Alumni of the University of Oxford
Alumni of the University of West London
South African film directors
South African male film actors
South African male writers
Stellenbosch University alumni
University of Cape Town alumni